Omarabad (also Romanized as ʿOmarābād) is a village in Polan Rural District, Polan District, Chabahar County, Sistan and Baluchestan Province, Iran. At the 2006 census, its population was 80, in 12 families.

References 

Populated places in Chabahar County